In the United Kingdom, an arms-length management organisation (ALMO) is a not-for-profit company that provides housing services on behalf of a local authority. Usually an ALMO is set up by the authority to  manage and improve all or part of its housing stock.  Ownership of the housing stock itself normally stays with the local authority.  , seventy ALMOs were managing over half of all UK council housing, consisting of more than a million properties. This number has since reduced as local authorities have taken services back in-house or stock has been transferred, of 2016 there are 37 ALMOs who manage nearly a third of local authority housing, approximately half a million council and ALMO homes.

Ownership

ALMOs are owned by local authorities and operate under the terms of a management agreement between the authority and the organisation. An ALMO is managed by an (often unpaid) board of directors which includes tenants, local authority nominees, and independent members.  At least a third of an ALMO board is normally made up of tenants.

The work of an ALMO may touch and overlap with that of a tenant management organisation (TMO).

Purpose

Establishment of an ALMO separates the day to day housing management role of the landlord from the wider strategic housing role of the local authority.  However, the local authority normally retains ownership of the housing and tenants remain secure tenants of the local authority.  Ministers do not give consent to the establishment of a new ALMO without clear evidence that the council has consulted its tenants and leaseholders and can demonstrate a balance of support from them for the ALMO proposal.  Unlike a stock transfer to a housing association, councils can transfer management of their housing to an ALMO without holding a ballot, although many councils undertake a ballot in any case.

Through the ALMO Programme, Communities and Local Government (CLG) offer additional resources towards the cost of achieving the Decent Homes Standard to councils which set up ALMOs that were assessed as 2* (good) or 3* (excellent) on inspection by the Housing Inspectorate (which was part of the Audit Commission).

A number of ALMOs are considering whether to proceed with the construction of new housing which would be owned and managed by the ALMO.  The ability of ALMOs to undertake new build projects is considered by the Government to be a way for ALMOs to develop and be financially viable post 2010, i.e. after the Decent Homes target date.

Criticisms

Since ALMOs are non-profit organisations which can receive extra funding from the government, dependent on performance, it can be argued that cost cuts are inevitable.  Some say that as a result, the conditions and pay for their staff (except the management) is much lower than in the private sector, leading to a high level of staff turnover. However, the only inevitable additional cost of an ALMO is for its governance arrangements, which are typically less than 1% of management costs.

Critics of the ALMO system, such as Defend Council Housing (DCH), have characterised ALMOs as a stepping stone to stock transfer, in areas where this would have previously been politically unacceptable.

Level of success

The National Federation of ALMOs stated that as at March 2008, 77% of tenants reported satisfaction with ALMO housing management.  They also stated that 90% of ALMOs which have been inspected achieved a 2 or 3 star rating, therefore being eligible for extra funding.  They also report significant efficiency savings and an enhanced timetable for reaching the Decent Homes Standard for much of the country's housing stock.

In 2009 the government diverted money from ALMOs to building new homes. Councils that had promoted ALMOs in order to access the extra funding, and the tenants who had got involved, felt betrayed at the decision.

Tax status

An ALMO cannot benefit from the same tax exemptions as a local authority.  As a result, after discussions with KPMG, HM Revenue & Customs have published guidance which states that provided certain conditions are met they will view activities between the ALMO and the local authority as a non-trading activity and so any profit arising will not be taxable.

List of ALMOs

A list of ALMOs can be found on the website for the National Federation of ALMOs, together with copies of inspection reports and the number of stars achieved upon inspection.

References

External links
National Federation of ALMOs
Social Housing Law Association
BBC Politics of Housing
BBC Decent Homes
Defend Council Housing

Companies owned by municipalities of the United Kingdom
Public housing in the United Kingdom